Ye Chong (born November 29, 1969 in Jiangsu) is a male Chinese foil fencer who competed at the 1988, 1992, 1996, 2000 and 2004 Summer Olympics. He was the junior world champion in Athens in 1989.

He first competed at the Olympics in 1988 where he finished eighth with the Chinese foil team in the Olympic team foil event.

Four years later he finished ninth in the individual Olympic foil tournament and tenth with the Chinese foil team in the team event.

In 1996 he was eliminated in the round of 16 of the Olympic foil tournament and finished ninth with the Chinese foil team in the team event.

Four years later he won the silver medal as part of the Chinese foil team. In the 2000 Olympic foil tournament he was eliminated in the round of 16 again.

In 2004 he won the silver medal again as a member of the Chinese foil team.

References

1969 births
Living people
Chinese male foil fencers
Fencers at the 1988 Summer Olympics
Fencers at the 1992 Summer Olympics
Fencers at the 1996 Summer Olympics
Fencers at the 2000 Summer Olympics
Fencers at the 2004 Summer Olympics
Olympic fencers of China
Olympic silver medalists for China
Olympic medalists in fencing
Fencers from Jiangsu
Medalists at the 2000 Summer Olympics
Medalists at the 2004 Summer Olympics
Asian Games medalists in fencing
Fencers at the 1990 Asian Games
Fencers at the 1994 Asian Games
Asian Games gold medalists for China
Asian Games silver medalists for China
Medalists at the 1990 Asian Games
Medalists at the 1994 Asian Games
21st-century Chinese people
20th-century Chinese people